is a retired Japanese professional pitcher, who currently coaches for Orix Buffaloes.

External links

Living people
1970 births
Baseball people from Hiroshima Prefecture
Japanese baseball players
Nippon Professional Baseball pitchers
Orix BlueWave players
Tohoku Rakuten Golden Eagles players
Japanese baseball coaches
Nippon Professional Baseball coaches